Lajoie Dam is the uppermost of the storage dams of BC Hydro's Bridge River Power Project, which is located in the southwestern Interior of British Columbia.  It is located just west of the small semi-ghost town of Gold Bridge.  An earthfill structure, it is 87 m (287 ft) and impounds c.  of water in Downton Lake Reservoir.  The Lajoie Powerhouse generates 22 MW with an average generating capacity of 170 GWh/year.  A few miles downstream is Carpenter Lake, which is formed by Terzaghi Dam, the largest of the Bridge River Power Project's structures.

Downton Reservoir is named for Geoffrey M. Downton, a pioneer surveyor who was the first to recognize the hydroelectric potential in the drop in elevation between the Bridge and Seton river systems.  Lajoie Dam and Powerhouse are atop the site of Lajoie Falls, which was named after Lazack Lajoie, a local "mountain man" and entrepreneur-huckster who promoted a townsite and mining complex around Gun Lake which never came to fruition.

References
 Water Powers, British Columbia, BC Dept of Lands and Forests Water Rights Branch, Victoria 1954

External links

BC Hydro Bridge River Development Rec Site
Bridge River-Lillooet Archive Lajoie Dam page
Aerial view of Downton Lake, looking west
Aerial view of Lajoie Dam from overhead from Randall & Kat's Flying Photos

Dams in British Columbia
Bridge River Country
BC Hydro
Publicly owned dams in Canada